Nkumbi, Humbe, or Khumbi, is a Bantu language of Angola.

References

Southwest Bantu languages
Languages of Angola